Pavel Trnka (born July 26, 1976) is a Czech former professional ice hockey defenceman. He played seven seasons in the National Hockey League with the Mighty Ducks of Anaheim and Florida Panthers between 1997 and 2004. The rest of his career, which lasted from 1993 to 2012, was mainly spent in the Czech Extraliga. Internationally Trnka played the for the Czech national team at both the junior and senior level. After retiring from play, Trnka went into coaching, and has worked with HC Vítkovice at their senior and youth level since 2012.

Trnka was drafted 106th overall by the Mighty Ducks of Anaheim in the 1994 NHL Entry Draft and started his NHL career with the Ducks in 1997 and stayed there for six seasons before he was traded to the Florida Panthers for Sandis Ozolinsh and Lance Ward. In total, Trnka played 411 regular season games, scoring 14 goals and 63 assists for 77 points and collecting 323 penalty minutes. He left the NHL after the 2004 season to return to the Czech Republic for HC Lasselsberger Plzeň.  He had two spells in Sweden's Elitserien for Leksands IF and Malmö Redhawks.

Career statistics

Regular season and playoffs

International

External links 
 

1976 births
Living people
Anaheim Ducks draft picks
Baltimore Bandits players
Cincinnati Mighty Ducks players
Czech ice hockey coaches
Czech ice hockey defencemen
Florida Panthers players
HC Plzeň players
HC Vítkovice players
Leksands IF players
Malmö Redhawks players
Mighty Ducks of Anaheim players
Rytíři Kladno players
Sportspeople from Plzeň
Czech expatriate ice hockey players in the United States
Czech expatriate ice hockey players in Sweden